Andrew Massey may refer to:
Andrew Massey (British Army officer) (1943–1998), British SAS officer
Andrew Massey (conductor) (1946–2018), British conductor and composer
Andy Massey (born 1961), English football midfielder